Mohsenabad (also Romanized as Moḩsenābād; also known as Sākhtemān) is a village in Kamaraj Rural District, Kamaraj and Konartakhteh District, Kazerun County, Fars Province, Iran. At the 2006 census, its population was 95, in 21 families.

References 

Populated places in Kazerun County